Tmesisternus isabellae is a species of beetle in the family Cerambycidae. It was described by Snellen van Vollenhoven in 1871. It is known from Papua New Guinea and Indonesia.

References

isabellae
Beetles described in 1871